Kodarma Assembly constituency   is an assembly constituency in  the Indian state of Jharkhand.It comes under Kodarma Lok Sabha constituency.

Bihar Members of Assembly

Jharkhand Members of Legislative Assembly

See also
Vidhan Sabha
List of states of India by type of legislature

References

Assembly constituencies of Jharkhand
Kodarma